West Falmouth station was a railroad station located on Old Dock Road in West Falmouth, Massachusetts.

The original station opened in 1872. It was torn down after rail service ended and the structure was removed prior to September, 1999. The tracks were raised and removed in 2008. In the following year, the Shining Sea Bikeway was completed in North Falmouth next to the rail line to Otis Air National Guard Base.

References

External links

Falmouth, Massachusetts
Former railway stations in Massachusetts
Old Colony Railroad Stations on Cape Cod